In chemistry, ligand close packing theory (LCP theory),  sometimes called the ligand close packing model describes how ligand – ligand repulsions affect the geometry around a central atom. It has been developed by R. J. Gillespie and others from 1997 onwards  and is said to sit alongside VSEPR which was originally developed by R. J. Gillespie and R Nyholm. The inter-ligand distances in a wide range of molecules have been determined. The example below shows a series of related molecules: 

The consistency of the interligand distances (F-F and O-F) in the above molecules is striking and this phenomenon is repeated across a wide range of molecules and forms the basis for LCP theory.

Ligand radius
From a study of known structural data a series of inter-ligand distances has been determined and it has been found that there is a constant inter-ligand radius for a given central atom. The table below shows the inter-ligand radius (pm) for some of the period 2 elements:

The ligand radius should not be confused with the ionic radius.

Treatment of lone pairs
In LCP theory a lone pair is treated as a ligand. Gillespie terms the lone pair a lone pair domain and states that these lone pair domains push the ligands together until they reach the interligand distance predicted by the relevant inter-ligand radii. An example demonstrating this is shown below, where the F-F distance is the same in the AF3 and AF4+ species :

LCP and VSEPR
LCP and VSEPR make very similar predictions as to geometry but LCP theory  has the advantage that predictions are more quantitative particularly for the second period elements, Be, B, C, N, O, F. Ligand -ligand repulsions are important when 
the central atom is small e.g. period 2, (Be, B, C, N, O)
the ligands are only weakly electronegative compared to the central atom
the ligands are large compared to the central atom
 there are 5 or more ligands around the central atom

References

Chemistry theories
Molecular geometry
Stereochemistry
Quantum chemistry